The history of the Bengali Hindus in Myanmar dates back to the Middle Ages, when the Arakanese kings brought Brahmins from Bengal as astrologers and Doms as cleaners of the pagoda compounds in Arakan. After the annexation of Burmese kingdom by the British, the Bengali Hindus arrived in British Burma in various capacities. A large section came as white collared executives in the administration, while a smaller proportion came as labourers in various projects. By the 1920s, the Bengali Hindus constituted a thriving community in the urban centres like Rangoon, Mandalay, Moulmein, Bassein and Akyab. Starting with the anti-Indian movements in the late 1930s, the Bengali Hindus began to leave British Burma in hundreds. After the independence and especially the 1962 coup, large numbers of Bengali Hindus left for India.

At present, the Bengali Hindu population is concentrated in the cities of Yangon and Sittwe and in the some of the semi-urban and rural areas of Rakhine State. The estimated population quoted in various source range between 10,000 and 56,000. The Bengali Hindus are not recognized as full citizens as per the 1982 law, but are entitled to hold the ID Card for National Verification.

Identity 
In Myanmar, the citizenship issue of the Rohingyas has led to identity crisis among the Bengali Hindu population. While the Rohingyas prefer to use the term Rohingya to identify themselves, the Myanmar authorities insist on using the term Bengalis for the Rohingyas. As the Rohingyas are considered as illegal Bangladeshi immigrants, the Bengali Hindus in Rakhine State shun the usage of the term Bengali to identify themselves. They prefer to identify themselves as Burmese Hindus.

In the recent times, the Bengali Hindus have started wearing small armbands to distinguish themselves from the Rohingya. The Bengali Hindu women have started wearing bindis to distinguish themselves from the Rohingyas.

Persecution 
In 1962, after the coup, an estimated 300,000 Indians were forced to leave Burma. The repatriates included a significant number of Bengali Hindus of East Bengal origin. The Bengali Hindu returnees were settled in four camps in Kamarhati, Barasat, Bongaon and Hasnabad, in the 24 Parganas district of West Bengal.

See also 
 Kha Maung Seik massacre
 Bengali Hindu diaspora

References 

Ethnic groups in Myanmar
Bengali Hindus
Hinduism in Myanmar